The 1916 Democratic National Convention was held at the St. Louis Coliseum in St. Louis, Missouri from June 14 to June 16, 1916. It resulted in the nomination of President Woodrow Wilson and Vice President Thomas R. Marshall for reelection.

Demonstrations 
Women's suffrage activists in Missouri staged a demonstration for the convention. Suffragists Emily Newell Blair and Edna Gellhorn came up with the idea and organized a "walkless, talkless parade," also called the "Golden Lane." Around 3,000 suffragists lined twelve blocks of Locust Street in St. Louis, wearing white dresses, "votes for women" sashes and holding yellow umbrellas. Democratic delegates had to walk past the suffragists to reach the convention hall. The demonstration was meant to represent how women were silenced by not being allowed to vote and received national attention in the press. The Democratic delegates did decide to support women's suffrage on a state by state basis.

Images

See also
1916 Democratic Party presidential primaries
List of Democratic National Conventions
U.S. presidential nomination convention
History of the United States Democratic Party
1916 Republican National Convention
1916 United States presidential election

References

Sources

External links 
 
The Political Grave Yard: 1916 Democratic National Convention
 Democratic Party Platform of 1916 at The American Presidency Project
 Wilson Nomination Acceptance Speech for President at DNC (transcript) The American Presidency Project

1916 conferences
1916 United States presidential election
1916 in Missouri
Conventions
Conventions in St. Louis
Political conventions in Missouri
Missouri Democratic Party
Democratic National Conventions
June 1916 events